Yaroslav Vasilevich Smelyakov (December 26, 1913 to November 27, 1972) was a Russian Soviet poet, critic and translator. In 1967, he was awarded the USSR State Prize, one of the most prestigious honors in the Soviet Union.

Early life 
Smelyakov was born on December 26, 1912, in Lutsk (now Ukraine). He was the son of a railroad worker. He spent his childhood in the village, where he graduated from elementary school. He then studied at the Moscow seven year school.

He graduated from the printing factory school in 1931 and then went to work in a print shop.

Career 
At the urging of a friend, journalist Vsevolod Jordansky, Smelyakov brought his poems to the editor of a youth magazine; however, by mistake, he entered the building of the Oktyabr, where he was received by the poet Mikhail Svetlov, whom he adored. Svetlov allowed Smelyakov's poems to be published.

In 1934-1937, he was the victim of the purges conducted by the NKVD.

Smelyakov took part in the Great Patriotic War. From June to November 1941, he served on the North and Karelian Fronts. Once in the environment, he was in Finnish captivity until 1944. Returning from captivity, Smelyakov again came to the Gulag.

Thanks to Konstantin Simonov, who put in a good word, he was able to return to writing his book "Kremlin spruces" in 1948.

In 1951, after double denunciation by two poets, was arrested again and sent to the Polar Inta. Smelyakov lived there until 1955 when he was allowed to return home under an amnesty but not yet rehabilitated. He was rehabilitated later in 1956.

Since 1967, Smelyakov was a member of the Union of Soviet Writers where he presided over the Poetic division of the Union.

Creativity
Smelyakov began to write poetry early in his life. He wrote propaganda for review. He made his debut in print in 1931.

References

External links
 Ярослав Смеляков. Стихотворения

1913 births
1972 deaths
People from Lutsk
People from Volhynian Governorate
Soviet poets
Russian male poets
Soviet male writers
20th-century Russian male writers
Socialist realism writers
Russian-language poets
Soviet military personnel of World War II
World War II prisoners of war held by Finland
Gulag detainees
Recipients of the USSR State Prize
Recipients of the Lenin Komsomol Prize
Burials at Novodevichy Cemetery